Acacia hemiteles, commonly known as tan wattle, is a shrub  in the family Fabaceae.  It is widely distributed throughout south central Western Australia.  It was formerly thought to be endemic to Western Australia, but has recently been collected near Maralinga in South Australia. Tan wattle is a good coloniser of disturbed or burnt ground, and is therefore often seen in mining areas.

Tan wattle grows to a height of about three metres.  It is bushy, and is often broader than it is high.  Like most Acacia species, it has phyllodes rather than true leaves.  These are a grey-green colour, around seven centimetres long and 4 millimetres wide.  The flowers are yellow, and held in small spherical clusters that arise in the leaf axils.  The pods are brown, about ten centimetres long and one centimetre wide.

See also
List of Acacia species

References

 
 
 

hemiteles
Acacias of Western Australia
Fabales of Australia
Taxa named by George Bentham